Golpo Chalao Film Banao was a short film competition organized by Stop Not Bangladesh. The first announcement of this competition was published on 14 September at Spectra Convention Center, Gulshan, [Dhaka]. Any university student can participate in this competition. At first organizing authority will tell students the few hints about the film story and university student will finish that short film which will be published on various dailies, televisions and social media to collect public opinion. After three months the jury board will announce the winner based on SMS votes, social media popularity, and the jury's score. 10 university participate in this competition and 10 short film has been selected for the final competition. Gray advertising and Karkhana Production helped in this competition.

References 

Short film festivals
Student film festivals
Film festivals in Bangladesh